Andrei Vladimirovich Vasilyev (born March 30, 1972) is a Russian professional ice hockey left winger.

Career 
Vasilyev was drafted in the eleventh round, 248th overall, by the New York Islanders in the 1992 NHL Entry Draft. He played sixteen games in the National Hockey League, fifteen over three seasons with the Islanders and one with the Phoenix Coyotes in the 1998–99 season.

Career statistics

Regular season and playoffs

External links

1972 births
Living people
Avangard Omsk players
Berlin Capitals players
Denver Grizzlies players
Frankfurt Lions players
Grand Rapids Griffins (IHL) players
HC CSKA Moscow players
HC Khimik Voskresensk players
Metallurg Novokuznetsk players
Idaho Steelheads (ECHL) players
Las Vegas Thunder players
Linköping HC players
Long Beach Ice Dogs (IHL) players
Soviet ice hockey left wingers
New York Islanders draft picks
New York Islanders players
People from Voskresensk
Phoenix Coyotes players
Revier Löwen players
Russian ice hockey left wingers
Russian Penguins players
Utah Grizzlies (IHL) players
Sportspeople from Moscow Oblast